The 2015 Semen Padang season is the 3rd season competing in the Indonesia Super League.

Review and events

Pre–2015 
Their first training for the 2015 Indonesia Super League on December 1, 2014.

Matches

Legend

Friendlies

Indonesia Super League

Statistics

Squad 

|}

Disciplinary record

Transfers

In

Out

Sources

External links 
 Semen Padang season at ligaindonesia.co.id 
 2015 Semen Padang season at semenpadangfc.co.id 

Semen Padang F.C.
Semen Padang